Harry Winston (March 1, 1896December 8, 1978) was an American jeweler. He donated the Hope Diamond to the Smithsonian Institution in 1958 after owning it for a decade. He also traded the Portuguese Diamond to the Smithsonian in 1963 in exchange for 3,800 carats of small diamonds.

Winston founded the Harry Winston Inc. in New York City in 1932. He had been called by many the "King of Diamonds".

History 
Winston's father Jacob started a small jewelry business. He and Winston's mother were Jewish immigrants to the United States from the Russian Empire. While growing up, Harry worked in his father's shop. When he was twelve years old, he recognized a two-carat emerald in a pawn shop, bought it for 25 cents, and sold it two days later for $800. Winston started his business in 1920 and opened his first store in New York City in 1932.

Winston's jewelry empire began in 1926, with his acquisition of Arabella Huntington's jewelry collection, for $1.2 million. The wife of railroad magnate Henry E. Huntington, Arabella amassed one of the world's most prestigious collections of jewelry, largely from Parisian jewelers such as Cartier. When Winston bought the collection after her death, the designs of the jewelry in the collection were quite old fashioned. Winston redesigned the jewelry into more contemporary styles and showcased his unique skill at jewelry crafting.

When he died, Winston left the company to his two sons, Ronald and Bruce, who then entered into a decade-long battle over the control of the company. In 2000, Ronald along with new business partner, Fenway Partners, bought Bruce out from the company for $54.1 million.

On March 26, 2013, Harry Winston, Inc. was bought by the Swatch Group of Switzerland.

Legacy 

Winston was among the most noted jewelers in the world, well-known to the general public. In the 1953 musical film Gentlemen Prefer Blondes, the song "Diamonds Are a Girl's Best Friend" includes the spoken interjection "Talk to me, Harry Winston, tell me all about it!" The Lauren Weisberger comic novel Chasing Harry Winston was published in May 2008.

In a 2009 Episode of Law and Order: Special Victims Unit, bank robber Frank Hager references a diamond heist as "$750,000 of Harry Winston's Finest"

In 2015, Harry Winston, Inc. operated 39 salons and numerous retail affiliates in locations such as New York, Beverly Hills, Las Vegas, Dallas, Honolulu, Bal Harbour, Chicago, Costa Mesa, and other countries around the world.

Noted diamonds Winston owned

A–C 
Originally the stones were thought to be a match, but when Winston bought them, removed them from their settings and discovered they were not, he decided to recut them slightly to improve their clarity and brilliance. Both were either colorless or near-colorless, and antique pear-shaped brilliants.
 The Anastasia, three emerald cuts weighing , all D color and Flawless clarity. Cut from a rough crystal weighing  Winston had purchased in 1972, largest gem named after Anastasia Nikolaevna, daughter of Czar Nicholas II.
Purchased by Winston from a Chinese dealer in 1947; subsequently sold and repurchased several times by the firm. Stone was recut slightly in 1977 from its original weight of  before it was sold again as a ring.
After the cut was made, Cartier sold it to the Unzue family of Argentina in 1910. It reappeared in Paris in 1953 where it was purchased by an important European titled family, then purchased by Harry Winston in 1959. Winston mounted it in a ring and sold it to Marjorie Merriweather Post, who later donated it to the Smithsonian Institution.
 The Cornflower Blue,  pear brilliant;  round brilliant, blue, cut from  South African rough which Winston purchased in 1958. The larger stone was sold in 1969 as the pendant for a diamond necklace. Winston repurchased it two years later, then sold it to a Middle Eastern client. The round brilliant was set as a ring and sold in 1969. In 1987 the pear brilliant was auctioned in Geneva, Switzerland.
Purchased by Winston in 1959 from namesake and recut to a flawless . Sold to an American industrialist in 1966.

D–I 

 The Deal Sweetener, a  diamond plus four smaller stones, D color and Flawless, emerald cut. In 1974 Winston bought a large parcel of diamonds worth $24,500,000—at that time the largest individual sale of diamonds in history. Harry Oppenheimer, head of De Beers Consolidated Mines Ltd., arranged the transaction. When Winston asked Oppenheimer, "How about a little something to sweeten the deal?" Harry Oppenheimer pulled a  rough diamond out of his pocket and rolled it across the table. Winston picked up the stone, smiled, and said simply, "Thanks." It was cut into five gems, the largest being named the Deal Sweetener. All were sold that same year.
Purchased by Winston in 1954 from Cary W. Bok, then sold the following year to Eleanor Loder from Canada. Resurfaced in 1971 and put up for auction at Christie's in Geneva. This stone is also the largest known diamond to receive irradiation treatment, which improved its color.
Acquired by Winston in 1977 and mounted in a diamond necklace. Sold the same year to a Saudi Arabian prince.
 The Graff Pink of 24.78 carats, graded Fancy Intense Pink colour and with a November 2010 Sotheby's auction pre-sale estimate price of US $27 million to US $38 million (£17 million to £24 million). Sotheby's sold the rare pink diamond ring for $46.16 million to London jeweler Laurence Graff.
He bought this diamond in 1949 and later donated it to Smithsonian in 1958. He sent the diamond to the museum via a registered first-class mail. The package in which he sent the Hope diamond is found among the Smithsonian's collection.
Allegedly first seen in 1607 when the East India Company seized the stone from its owner, a Persian prince named Ragab, as payment for debts. Resurfaced in 1906 in the possession of Sultan Abdul Hamid II. The stone, along with the Hope Diamond and Star of the East, were stolen from the sultan by his messenger and sold to French pawn shops. The stones were intended to provide a comfortable retirement for the sultan. Appeared at the June 1909 auction held in Paris by gem dealer and collector Selim Habib, where it was purchased by a Spanish nobleman. It then came into the possession of a London bank and eventually was bought by a Dutch diamond dealer, from whom Winston purchased the stone in November 1946. Winston sold the diamond in 1947 to May Bonfils Stanton, daughter of the publisher and co-founder of The Denver Post. It was mounted as the center stone in a diamond necklace with eighty-six other diamonds totalling . In 1963, after Bonfils Stanton's death, the gem was sold at auction in New York City. Renowned jeweler Lawrence Graff of London also owned the stone.
 The Indore Pears,  but later recut to   respectively, colorless, both pear-shaped antique brilliants. Originally owned by Maharaja Tukoji Rao III Holkar who was forced to abdicate due to a scandal in 1926. Despite his abdication he remained very wealthy and retained the diamonds. He married American Nancy Anne Miller in 1928 amid much international publicity. Miller converted to Hinduism and after marrying was known as Maharani Shamista Devi Holkar. Winston purchased the two diamonds in 1946 from the former maharaja and his wife, both of whom had worn the stones on many occasions. Winston sold the gems in 1953 to a client from Philadelphia and repurchased them in 1958. They were then sold to a New York client and were once again purchased in 1976 and sold to a member of a royal family. In 1981 and again in 1987, the two noted diamonds were sold at auction in Geneva.
 The Isadora Diamond, an  yellow diamond worth $5–6 million, first worn by Whoopi Goldberg at the 74th Academy Awards, then later worn by Kate Hudson and Liliane Montevecchi in the 2003 film How to Lose a Guy in 10 Days. In the film, it's called the "Isadora Diamond", named after Isadora Duncan. The necklace was sold shortly after filming finished.

J–M 
 The Jonker, twelve gems, the largest weighing , colorless, various shapes. Discovered as a  rough crystal in January 1934 and purchased by Winston from the Diamond Producers Association in London in 1935. It was the first time a major diamond crystal was cleaved in the United States. Winston is said to have loved the stone and refused to sell it for many years, using it instead for display at various charitable exhibitions, set in a platinum necklace with 110 baguette-cut diamonds. He sold the gem in 1951 to King Farouk of Egypt, who went into exile the following year, taking the gem with him. It was unheard of until 1959 when it was rumored that Queen Ratna of Nepal had been seen wearing it. It was later confirmed that Farouk did indeed sell the diamond to Nepal for a reported price of $100,000. It was later sold in 1974 at a Hong Kong auction for $4 million. A marquise shape and ten emerald cuts comprise the other diamonds cut from the crystal, the larger gems included emerald cuts of 41.30 (known as the Jonker II), 35.45 (Jonker III), 30.70 (Jonker IV), 25.66 (Jonker V) and 24.41 (Jonker VI) carats. Jonkers IV and VI were sold to American clients while the other three were sold to Indian maharajas. The smallest Jonker satellite stone, Jonker XII, a  emerald cut, was auctioned in New York in October 1975.
 The Lesotho, eighteen different diamonds, pale brown, various shapes. The diamond was discovered by Ernestine Ramaboa in May 1967 at the Letseng-la-Terai diggings in Lesotho. The crystal was sold at auction in Maseru to a South African dealer who then sold it to a European dealer. It was later purchased in Geneva by Winston. In 1969, he had it cut into eighteen stones totalling . The largest three gems were a  emerald-cut, a  emerald cut, and a  marquise brilliant, named Lesotho I, II and III, respectively. The  marquise was bought by Aristotle Onassis for his wife, Jacqueline Kennedy Onassis. The gem was sold at her estate sale auction for over $2 million.
 The Liberator, four gems weighing , D color, three emerald cuts and a marquise, respectively. Winston purchased the  Venezuelan crystal in 1943 and cut four stones from it. The three smaller gems were set in a clip and the largest was mounted in a ring and sold to the forementioned Mrs. May Bonfils Stanton, in 1946. He sold it to an American client in 1966, who sold it at auction in New York on December 7, 1972.
Reportedly the gem belonged to King Louis XIV of France but nothing of its history before Harry Winston bought it can be verified. Winston purchased the diamond in 1958 from the estate of Chrysler heiress Thelma Chrysler Foy. He then had it recut from  down to a flawless . He also obtained a  oval sapphire from the Foy estate. In 1959 the diamond was mounted as the center stone in a tiara that also contained six smaller pear-shaped diamonds totalling , and 233 smaller diamonds totalling . The diamond was exhibited at the Louvre in 1962, along with the Hope Diamond, as part of the Ten Centuries of French Jewelry exhibition. In 1963 it was removed from the tiara and sold together with the  Winston Diamond to Eleanor Loder from Canada, who wore the two stones in a pair of earrings. The Louis XIV was sold again in Geneva in 1981 from Loder's estate.
Boll collected nicknames like she collected jewelry: in 1921 she was hailed by newspapers as "Broadway's most beautiful blonde." She married Colombian coffee king Hernando Rocha in 1922, who presented her with a million dollars' worth of jewelry, mostly in the form of diamonds. The press referred to her as the "$250,000-a-day bride." She gained her most last nickname, "Queen of Diamonds", because she often appeared in public wearing all her jewelry. It was said that the rings she wore on her left hand alone were worth more than $400,000 ($ in  dollars). When she died in 1949 Winston purchased the large emerald-cut diamond. It was then featured in his Court of Jewels exhibition before being sold to a New York client in 1954. When the client died in 1965, Winston reacquired the diamond to a flawless , and sold it the following year to a European client. At this time it was designed to be worn as a ring or as the center stone to a bracelet set with an addition 112 smaller emerald-cut diamonds totaling .
The diamond was purchased by Harry Winston from the estate of Evalyn Walsh McLean along with other pieces of jewelry including the Hope Diamond and the Star of the East. He sold the McLean Diamond to the Duke and Duchess of Windsor in 1950. The Duchess, a collector of jewelry, wore the stone often and owned it until her death in 1986. It was sold at her estate sale auction in April 1987 for $3.15 million.

N–Z 

 Napoleon Diamond Necklace, various stones, colorless, antique cushion brilliants, pear-shaped antique cushion brilliants, briolette cuts. Napoleon gave it to his wife, Empress Marie-Louise, a Habsburg princess, to celebrate the birth of their son in March 1811. When Marie-Louise died in 1847 the necklace passed to her nephew's wife, Archduchess Sophie. Sophie left it to her third son, Archduke Karl Ludwig, upon her death in 1872. Karl Ludwig's grandson, Franz Joseph II, Prince of Liechtenstein, sold the necklace to French collector in 1948. Harry Winston bought the piece in 1960 and sold it to Marjorie Merriweather Post two years later. Post willed the necklace to the Smithsonian Institution, which received it in 1973.
The Nassak has an Indian origin. It was originally a triangular  Mogul-cut stone, similar in appearance to the Taj-I-Mah Diamond. The stone was supposedly set as the eye of an idol of the god Shiva. After the Third Anglo-Maratha War in 1817–18, the diamond was seized by the Governor-General, Lord Hastings, and became part of the loot taken from India. Named the Nassak, it was sent to England. It was purchased at auction by crown jewelers Rundell and Bridge in 1831 during a period of severe economic depression. In 1837, it was sold at auction to the Marquess of Westminster (he also bought the Arcots Diamonds and the King George IV Diamond at the same time). The Marquess mounted it in the hilt of his dress sword. The diamond remained in the Westminster family for nearly a century. In the 1920s, it was sold to a Parisian jeweler, who brought it to America in 1926 for display. The stone later returned to Paris where it was bought by Winston in 1940, who had the stone recut to its present flawless  emerald cut shape. He then sold it to a New York jewelry firm in 1942. Mrs. William B. Leeds of New York purchased the gem in 1944 and wore it in a ring. It was sold at auction in New York in 1970.
Not much is known about this gem. It is thought to be a Golconda diamond and was owned by Jang Bahadur, the Prime Minister of Nepal, in the late 19th century and remained in the hands of Nepalese royalty until the mid-20th century. Winston purchased the diamond from an Indian dealer in 1957. At this time he had it slightly recut from its original  weight. It was set in a pendant/brooch combination and was featured in an article on diamonds and gems in the April 1958 issue of National Geographic magazine and then exhibited at London's "Ageless Diamond" exhibition the following year.
The gem was discovered as a  crystal at the Premier Mine in South Africa, in 1954. In 1956, it was sold to Winston as part of an $8.4 million parcel. The largest gem cut from it was a  pear-shaped diamond. The same year it was purchased by Stavros Niarchos, Greek shipbuilder and industrialist, whose name it currently bears. Also cut from the rough were a  marquise and a  emerald cut. They were also purchased by Niarchos.
The Oppenheimer was discovered in 1964 at the Dutoitspan Mine near Kimberley, South Africa. The stone is noted for being extraordinarily well-formed. Winston purchased the gem the same year it was found and donated it to the Smithsonian Institution in memory of Sir Ernest Oppenheimer, chairman of the board of De Beers Consolidated Mines Ltd from 1929 until 1957.
 Queen Marie of Roumania sapphire, a 478.68 carat cushion cut from Sri Lanka. Set and reset by Cartier in the early 1900s, it forms a drop pendant. When sold in 2003, it was the largest sapphire ever sold at auction.
 Spanish Inquisition Necklace, a diamond and emerald-studded necklace, which was named so by Winston. It was acquired from Yashvantrao II, the Maharaja of Indore in 1947 and then sold to Cora Hubbard Williams in 1955
 Star of the East, a 94.78-carat, pear-shaped, D-color stone of VS2 clarity grade, which Winston purchased from the estate of Evalyn Walsh McLean.
 The Vargas diamond, a  uncut diamond which was later cut into 29 stones under Harry's direction.

See also 
Harry Winston, Inc.
Dominion Diamond Corporation

References

Further reading

External links 

 H. Winston biography/photograph {reference only}

1896 births
1978 deaths
20th-century American Jews
American jewellers
American jewelry designers
American people of Ukrainian-Jewish descent
Smithsonian Institution donors